Celebration Pass is a low pass through the Commonwealth Range just north of Mount Cyril permitting passage between Beardmore Glacier and Hood Glacier. The pass was crossed on Christmas Day, 1959, by the New Zealand Alpine Club Antarctic Expedition (1959–60) and was named by them because of the festivities held to celebrate the day.

References
 

Mountain passes of the Ross Dependency
Dufek Coast